The Laurence Olivier Award for Outstanding Achievement in Opera is an annual award presented by the Society of London Theatre in recognition of achievements in commercial London theatre. The awards were established as the Society of West End Theatre Awards in 1976, and renamed in 1984 in honour of English actor and director Laurence Olivier.

This award was first presented in 1977, and covers the breadth of a commingled group of specialties, including individual or combinations of: opera companies, orchestras, conductors, composers, singers, stage directors, theatre directors and libretto translators. It served as the only Olivier Award focused solely on opera until the 1993 introduction of the award for Best New Opera Production.

Winners and nominees

1970s

1980s

1990s

2000s

2010s

2020s

References

External links
 

Laurence Olivier Awards
Opera-related lists